How I Live Now is a 2013 romantic speculative drama film based on the 2004 novel of the same name by Meg Rosoff. It was directed by Kevin Macdonald, written by Tony Grisoni, Jeremy Brock and Penelope Skinner while starring Saoirse Ronan, George MacKay, Tom Holland, Harley Bird, Anna Chancellor and  Corey Johnson. The film centres around American teenager, Daisy (Saoirse Ronan) and her British cousins, Eddie (George MacKay), Isaac (Tom Holland) and Piper (Harley Bird), as they try to reunite during an apocalyptic nuclear war.

The film premiered at the 2013 Toronto International Film Festival during the special presentation section. Upon release the film received mixed reviews, with some critics praising the romance between Ronan and MacKay and positively comparing the former's role as Daisy to Jennifer Lawrence's role as Katniss Everdeen in The Hunger Games. The film was nominated for multiple awards across various categories including Ronan being nominated for a BIFA Award and a Saturn Award for Best Actress. MacKay and Ronan were both nominated for Best Young Actor at the London Film Critics' Circle. MacKay also went on to win the Breakthrough Award at the Richard Attenborough Film Awards.

Plot
Sometime in the future, Daisy, a maladjusted young American teenager is sent to the English countryside for the summer to stay with her Aunt Penn and her three children: Eddie, Isaac and Piper. Daisy arrives at Heathrow Airport to tightened security and reports of a bombing in Paris and is greeted by Isaac who drives her to their farm. Initially abrasive Daisy warms up to her cousins and their neighbour's son, Joe. Daisy also learns from her aunt that her late mother also used to stay at the farm frequently. Meanwhile, Daisy falls in love with her eldest cousin, Eddie. A few days after her arrival, Penn flies to Geneva to attend an emergency conference because she is an expert in terrorist extremist groups.

The children's summer fun ends when a terrorist coalition detonates a nuclear bomb in London that kills hundreds of thousands and in the aftermath, the electricity goes out, and they learn from an emergency radio broadcast that martial law has been imposed. Daisy is offered safe passage home back to America but decides to stay, set upon her love for Eddie. Later on, the British Army storms their home and separates the boys and girls who are to be evacuated to separate parts of the country. Eddie tries to fight back but is pinned down by the soldiers. He instead calls for Daisy to return to their home whenever she can get the chance.

Daisy and Piper are fostered in the home of a British Army major and his wife. Their neighbourhood is attacked by terrorists and Joe who was fostered in the same town is killed. Daisy and Piper escape to the countryside and begin a six day walk back to the house. Daisy witnesses mistreatment of apparent captives at a camp and sometime thereafter a massacre near the camp where Isaac and Eddie were taken. Daisy finds that although Eddie is not among the dead, Isaac's body is. She mournfully takes his glasses and later buries them. As they leave, they are spotted by two armed men, who chase them through the woods. Daisy shoots them both and the two girls flee.

Later, the girls are on the verge of giving up until they see Eddie's pet hawk fly overhead. They follow it back home where they discover that the military garrison stationed there has been massacred and the house is empty. Only their dog remains. The next morning, Daisy follows the dog out into the woods, where she finds Eddie lying unconscious with scars and his eyes swollen shut.

In the aftermath of the war, Daisy nurses Eddie. A ceasefire is announced, electricity is returned, a new government forms, and the country begins to recover. Eddie now suffers from post-traumatic stress disorder and is mute. Daisy promises to be there for him holding onto hope that he will recover.

Cast

Production
The film was produced by Cowboy Films (which has also produced Kevin Macdonald's The Last King of Scotland and Black Sea) and Passion Pictures, with support from Film4 and BFI. Filming began in June 2012 in England and Wales. Macdonald said of the film:

Release
How I Live Now premiered at the 2013 Toronto International Film Festival. The film was released on 4 October 2013 in the United Kingdom and was set for release on 28 November 2013 in Australia. On 25 July 2013, Magnolia Pictures acquired the US rights to distribute the film.

Reception

Critical reception

Upon release, the film received mixed reviews. Rotten Tomatoes reports that 66% of 109 surveyed critics gave the film an average rating of 6.20/10. The site's consensus states: "Led by another strong performance from Saoirse Ronan and a screenplay that subverts YA clichés, How I Live Now blends young love with post-apocalyptic drama." Metacritic rated it 57 out of 100 based on reviews from 29 critics, indicating "mixed or average reviews".

Toronto Sun writer Steve Tilley praised Ronan's acting and positively compared her role as Daisy to that of Jennifer Lawrence's role as Katniss Everdeen in The Hunger Games series. He stated, "Kids battling for their lives in a near-future world taken from the pages of a young adult novel sounds a bit familiar - paging Katniss Everdeen - but How I Live Now has at least one major difference from Hollywood's interpretation of The Hunger Games: it doesn't shy away from graphic grimness". Ronan responded to the comparison saying, "What I love about [our film] is that it's very realistic, and it's very much a reminder that this could happen at any moment, and this is probably how it would be".

Justin Chang of Variety called it an "uneven but passionate adaptation". He wrote that the "role of Daisy likely wouldn't have worked with a less capable actress at the helm, and Ronan, whose recent performances in films like Hanna and The Host have proven her willing to get her hands dirty, gives flesh, ferocity and weight to the character's many transformations, from sullen ingrate to loving cousin, from passionate lover to Katniss Everdeen-style heroine". He also noted MacKay's performance calling it "a nice, watchful presence as the somewhat idealised love interest".

He also praised Macdonald's work in conjunction with the production of the film despite their limited resources and intimate scale. Todd McCarthy of The Hollywood Reporter called it "a derivative teen romance in an apocalyptic setting." Jeanette Catsoulis of The New York Times wrote that the film "struggles to balance a nebulous narrative on tentpole moments of rich emotional resonance." Alan Scherstuhl of The Village Voice also compared Daisy to Katniss calling the film a "tender, humane, and searing" film with "scenes of great beauty and world-ending terror." Conversely, Andy Klein, writer for Glendale News-Press felt the film "muddled" its way through the plot.

Accolades

Notes

References

External links
 
 

2013 war drama films
2013 drama films
2013 films
British post-apocalyptic films
British coming-of-age films
British war drama films
Dystopian films
Films about World War III
Films about nuclear war and weapons
Films about terrorism
Films based on British novels
Films directed by Kevin Macdonald (director)
Films produced by John Battsek
Films set in the United Kingdom
Incest in film
2010s English-language films
2010s British films